Container on barge is a form of intermodal freight transport where containers are stacked on a barge and towed to a destination on an inland waterway.

Mississippi River & tributaries

There is limited use of this mode of transport because a lack of infrastructure on the upriver side in the United States.  With the development of the Louisiana International Gulf Transfer Terminal at the mouth of the Mississippi River, container on barge traffic could become mainstream.

Missouri River
The Missouri River has no lock and dams on it and from Omaha, Nebraska to St. Louis and there is only one lock and dam above St. Louis to lock through, the Chain of Rocks Lock, to get to the lower Mississippi.

Ohio River
The Ohio River has 21 locks all the way up to Pittsburgh and locking through takes about 30–45 minutes with a full 3x5, 15 unit barge.

Upper Mississippi
The Upper Mississippi has 25+ locks and dams from St. Louis to Minneapolis that are 600-foot locks and only allow 6 to 8 barge units per tow without having to double lock through gates (double locking takes 2 hours+).

Lower Mississippi
The Lower Mississippi from St. Louis to the Port of New Orleans has no locks or dams and allows barges up to 7x6 or 42 barge units per tow.  Oceangoing ships with drafts of 45 feet and height clearances over 150 feet can navigate the waters up to Baton Rouge.

United States plans
Plans have been developed to create container terminals at the mouth of the Mississippi and St. Louis by Q4 2024.  The Mediterranean Shipping Company along with the State of Louisiana and other investors are going to invest $1.8 billion to build a container terminal at St. Bernard Parish, Louisiana, to open by 2028.

References

https://web.archive.org/web/20160221043642/http://sea-point.net/container/

Intermodal transport